Christian Rouellé (17 January 1922 – 15 January 2011) was a French footballer. He competed in the men's tournament at the 1948 Summer Olympics.

References

External links
 

1922 births
2011 deaths
French footballers
Olympic footballers of France
Footballers at the 1948 Summer Olympics
Place of birth missing
Association football midfielders
Racing Club de France Football players